The Tokammane Formation is a geologic formation in Norway. It preserves fossils dating back to the Cambrian period.

See also

 List of fossiliferous stratigraphic units in Norway

References 

Geologic formations of Norway
Geology of Svalbard
Cambrian System of Europe
Cambrian Norway
Cambrian south paleopolar deposits